Amanda Rosario (born Amanda Pegrum) is a British actress who has appeared in Hindi films as well as Tamil and Marathi films. After appearing in small roles in Hindi films, Rosario made her debut as a lead actress with the Tamil film, Saagasam (2016), starring alongside Prashanth.

Career
Born in Ilford, London to an English father and an Indian mother, she attended non-selective state school Beal High School where she obtained 11A* GCSEs. Rosario chose to enrol at The Centre for Performing Arts College in 2006 after becoming interested in dance and acting. Rosario began a career in performing arts by working as a dance teacher at Arts Educational Schools, London in 2008, before moving on to work as a model in commercial assignments. She subsequently represented brands including Perfect Asian and Pizza Hut, while also working on television commercials for Heart FM and ITV's Magic Numbers. Rosario made her acting debut by portraying a supporting role as Deepika Padukone's friend in Love Aaj Kal (2009), before working as a choreographer for the BBC Asian Network and as a freelance dancer for shows.

In 2013, Rosario appeared in an item number alongside Akshay Kumar in the Hindi gangster film, Once Upon ay Time in Mumbai Dobaara! (2013). In 2015, she worked as the lead actress in the Tamil film Saagasam (2016) and shot for the film in India, Malaysia and Japan. The team had initially kept her identity secret, before introducing her at a press conference during April 2015. Featuring alongside actor Prashanth, Saagasam opened to mixed reviews in February 2016.

In 2017, Rosario appeared in an item number alongside Rajneesh Duggal and Prem Chopra in the Hindi comedy film, Udanchhoo (2018).

Rosario later chose to continue her education and read Creative Writing and English at Birkbeck University of London graduating with first-class honours, before taking on a master's degree at the University of Cambridge in Writing for Performance.

Filmography

References

External links
 

Living people
Actresses from London
People from Ilford
Anglo-Indian people
British people of Indian descent
British film actresses
British actresses of Indian descent
English expatriates in India
Actresses in Hindi cinema
Actresses in Tamil cinema
Actresses in Marathi cinema
British expatriate actresses in India
European actresses in India
Actresses of European descent in Indian films
People educated at the Arts Educational Schools
Alumni of Birkbeck, University of London
Alumni of Lucy Cavendish College, Cambridge
21st-century English women
21st-century English people
21st-century British actresses
Year of birth missing (living people)